XEC-AM is a radio station in Tijuana, broadcasting on 1310 AM. It carries a news/talk format.

History
XEC's original concession was awarded to Luis E. Enciso in 1934. The Enciso family would own the station for 84 years until its sale in 2018 to Jaime Bonilla's PSN. The sale allowed Radio Enciso, which was financially strapped at the time, to avoid a strike by unionized employees, but it led to major programming reshuffles and left several station employees out of work. Unofficial reports place the station's sale price at about US$2.5 million.

References

1934 establishments in Mexico
Radio stations established in 1934
Radio stations in Tijuana
News and talk radio stations in Mexico